Camborne Treslothan was an electoral division of Cornwall in the United Kingdom which returned one member to sit on Cornwall Council between 2013 and 2021. It was abolished at the 2021 local elections, being succeeded by Four Lanes, Beacon and Troon.

Councillors

Extent
Camborne Treslothan represented the south east part of Camborne (including Pengegon), the villages of Troon, Bolenowe and Knave-Go-By as well as the hamlet of Higher Condurrow. The village of Brea was split between the divisions of Camborne Treslothan and Four Lanes. It covered 891 hectares in total.

Election results

2017 election

2013 election

References

Electoral divisions of Cornwall Council
Camborne